HMS Acasta was an  of the Royal Navy, and the name ship of that class. She was built between 1911 and 1913, and was initially designated a K-class torpedo boat destroyer, having at various times the pennant numbers G40, H59 (1914) or H00 (1918). She saw extensive service during the First World War, including at the Battle of Jutland, where she was badly damaged. She was sold for breaking up in 1921.

Construction
Acasta, originally intended to be named King, was laid down at John Brown's shipyard at Clydebank on 1 December 1911, launched on 10 September 1912 and completed the following month. After completion she joined the 4th Destroyer Flotilla.

Service during the First World War
Acasta served with the Grand Fleet from the outbreak of the First World War. On 16 December 1914 she was in the 4th Destroyer Flotilla attached to a battle group sent to challenge several German ships intent on bombarding the North Yorkshire coast.

Battle of Jutland
During the Battle of Jutland, the 4th Flotilla was attached to Admiral David Beatty's Battlecruiser Fleet based at Rosyth, and assigned to cover the 3rd Battlecruiser Squadron, screening the cruiser . Acasta was commanded by Lieutenant Commander J. O. Barron. The squadron left Pentland Firth in the evening of 30 May 1916 and engaged the enemy at 5.40pm on 31 May.

During the battle, destroyer  was crippled by gunfire and was offered assistance by the already damaged Acasta but declined. Admiral Beatty's report on the battle mentions an unknown, disabled destroyer which, from the time (about 7pm) may refer to Acasta. At 6.47 , the Grand Fleet's flagship, passed the disabled destroyer whose crew lined the sides to cheer the battleship as she passed. According to an eye-witness aboard , Acasta was "badly holed, with  standing by her."

She claimed a torpedo hit on  but this was not officially confirmed. The German Admiralty's report of the battle on 1 June included the claim that Acasta had been destroyed.

After Jutland
After extensive repairs, completed by 2 August, Acasta went back into service, joining one of the destroyer flotillas (4th or 6th) in one of the English Channel bases of Portsmouth, Devonport or Dover. She sustained damage, with three casualties, following a collision in the English Channel on 22 December 1917.

Post-war service
On 6 and 8 August 1919 Acasta attended the newly commissioned heavy cruiser  on torpedo trials in Freshwater Bay.

Fate
Acasta was sold on 9 May 1921 to Ward, Hayle for breaking up.

References

Further reading
 Map and timelines of Battle of Jutland
 Corbett, Sir Julian, History of the Great War - Naval Operations, Vol. 3, Longmans, 1921. Full text online at

External links
 
 Imperial War Museum: Lives of the First World War: HMS Acasta at the Battle of Jutland
 Battle of Jutland Crew Lists Project - HMS Acasta Crew List

 

Acasta-class destroyers
World War I destroyers of the United Kingdom
1912 ships
Ships built on the River Clyde